Xigu Subdistrict is one of the 9 subdistricts of Hongqiao District, Tianjin, China. It is located to the south of Xiyuzhuang and Dingzigu Subdistricts, west of Xinkaihe Subdistrict, north of Santiaoshi and Shaogongzhuang Subdistricts, as well as east of Heyuan and Xigongmen Subdistricts. In the year 2010, the subdistrict had a population of 86,971.

Its name Xigu refers to the subdistrict's location west of the Gu River (now known as North Canal).

Geography 
Xigu subdistrict is located on the north of Ziya River and west of the northern section of Grand Canal.

History

Administrative divisions 
By the year 2021, Xigu Subdistrict had 20 residential communities. They are listed in the table below:

Gallery

See also 

 List of township-level divisions of Tianjin

References 

Township-level divisions of Tianjin
Hongqiao District, Tianjin